Sittia Chiefdom is a chiefdom in Bonthe District of Sierra Leone. Its capital is Yonni.

References 

Chiefdoms of Sierra Leone
Southern Province, Sierra Leone